The Scottish Press Awards is an annual ceremony which recognises talent in Scottish journalism. The ceremony was established by the Scottish Newspaper Society (SNS), which "represents, protects, and promotes" Scotland's newspaper industry, in 1979.

See also
 British Press Awards
 List of British journalism awards

References

External links
 

British journalism awards
1979 establishments in Scotland
Annual events in Scotland
Awards established in 1979
Scottish awards